Mill Shoals is a village in Wayne and White counties in the U.S. state of Illinois. The population was 235 at the 2000 census, down to 176 at the 2020 census. In Fall 2022, Drew Lane Consultants LLC conducted a village-wide survey that totaled population at 157.

Geography
Mill Shoals is located at  (38.247904, -88.346608).

Mill Shoals is located in Illinois, two-thirds of the way from St. Louis, Missouri, to Evansville, Indiana, at the juncture of Interstate 64 and U.S. Highway 45."Inside a 200 mile radius of Mill Shoals is a unique geographical and historical area described as the Mid-America Basin. It was here, 175,000 years ago, that the Illinoian Glacier withdrew, leaving two great drainage systems in its wake. On the west side of the Basin the Illinois and Missouri Rivers join the Mississippi River; on the east side the Wabash and Tennessee Rivers join the Ohio River. The systems meet at Cairo, Illinois to begin a long journey through the Gulf Coastal Plain. The retreating glacier left rich mineral deposits of oil, coal, and fluorite to await 20th Century exploitation, and ground out a fine top-soil that was to yield vast timber areas of maple, ash, and oak, as well as fertile fields of wheat, corn, barley, and soybeans, As early as 15,000 B. C., pre-historic Indian peoples hunted the mammoths that roamed the area and eventually developed a series of substantial civilizations of the mounds and of the woodlands, climaxing in the Illini Confederation of the 17th and 18th Centuries. In the 18th Century, French and English explorers competed for these lands beginning with Marquette and Joliet in 1673 and ending with the American conquest under George Rogers Clark in 1778, when the Province of Virginia claimed the territory west to the Mississippi River. The next quarter century saw the advent of frontiersmen such as Daniel Boone paving the way for the great western migration. After the War of 1812, the pioneers poured into the Basin along the Cumberland Highway (now U. S. 40) through Terre Haute, Indiana, on the north side of the Basin. They came down the Ohio River from Cincinnati and Louisville, and from Tennessee and Kentucky across the Ohio at Shawneetown, just below the Wabash junction. Thus the Basin became the great staging area that was to funnel settlers through the gate of St. Louis into the far West. Subsequently, the area became the commercial, cultural, and political center for the new frontier--until the construction of the Illinois-­Michigan Canal in 1848 shifted the focus northward to Chicago. It was during this time that another famous trail-blazer made his way through the area, giving his name to the nearby Lincoln Heritage Trail. Significant among early 19th Century settlements were experiments in comprehensive self-sufficient communities such as Albion, Illinois, and New Harmony, Indiana, both in the Mill Shoals vicinity. With the advent of the Mill Shoals Human Development Project the Mid-American Basin once again becomes a staging area for the nation's effort to pioneer authentic local community."

From the 1978 Village Report by the Institute of Cultural Affairs:

"The Project area is in the northwest corner of White County, Illinois, thirty miles north of Carmi; the county seat, and 160 miles southeast of the state capital, Springfield, Illinois. Evansville, Indiana, is the nearest large city, sixty miles east. The project area is bounded on the north by the county line and on the west by the Skillet Fork River; it extends approximately one mile south and one and one-half miles east from these boun­daries. U. S. Highway 45 runs north and south through the town, and Interstate 64, a major east-west route, is two miles north of town. Approximately twenty per cent of the land is farmed (soy-bean and corn), thirty per cent is developed, and fifty per cent is unused. Thirty acres on the southeast edge of town is munici­pally owned. Annual flooding occurs over the western third of the project area in the flood plain. Of the 314 persons residing in the town of Mill Shoals, seventy-five are retired persons and 107 are dependent children. Educational facilities for the community are the elementary school in Mill Shoals and the high school in Fairfield. nine miles north on Highway 45. Fairfield also serves as the major commercial center used by Mill Shoals residents."

History

The first Euro-American settlers, primarily of Scotch-Irish descent, came to White County, Illinois between 1807 and 1809. The first settlements were near the Little Wabash River and Big Prairie, one of the numerous prairies in the county. Many came through the land office at Shawneetown, which was a port for flatboats which traveled the Ohio River. The second half of the 19th century saw the establishment of the towns of Norris City, Springerton including Mill Shoals. Once the home of a thriving barrel-making industry which depleted the nearby virgin forests Mill Shoals had primarily been an agriculture village until 1939 when oil was discovered in the area. In the early 1970s the oil industry declined steeply and thus returned Mill Shoals to its agricultural roots.
However, the town was greatly devastated by a large fire in the early forties and seventies and retains the authentic WPA Post office mural.

Many residents commute to nearby towns for employment including education, service, factories, and farms.In 1978: "Mill Shoals is a representative mid-American small town with a population of 314 people situated in White County in southern Illinois. It is one of many secluded villages in the hills surrounded by fer­tile river bottomlands that make up the Wabash Meadows. U. S. Highway 45 passes north-south through the center of town, and a spur of the Baltimore and Ohio Railroad, built in 1870, brings two freight trains weekly. A county road connects Mill Shoals with Burnt Prairie five miles east along the old stagecoach trail that once connected Ohio River traffic from Shawneetown to central Illinois."From the Institute of Cultural Affairs 1978 Human Development Project Report:"Incorporated in 1872, Mill Shoals takes its name from the water mill built by William Weed in 1835 on the shoals of the Skillet Fork River at the western boundary of the community. The town is governed by an elected mayor and council, who were responsible for a water supply system and a new grade school in 1965.

Mill Shoals sometimes refers to itself as the key ring capital of the world, an outgrowth of the ring binder, invented by Henry T. Adams of Mill Shoals in 1902, Besides the Adams Manufacturing Company is the Behimer and Kissner Grain Elevator and the more recent Grace Agricultural Products (chemical fertilizers). In addition there is a post office, a hardware store that doubles as an ice manufac­turing source for the area, a grocery store, cafe, two service sta­tions, two beauty shops, several private contractors, a funeral parlor, and five churches.

Mill Shoals has a high percentage of retired senior citizens. Most of the citizens who are employed work in nearby Fairfield. The town began informally between 1808 and 1835 as various groups of settlers camped on the high ground in the "drowned lands". Unremitting floods, plus major fires in 1900 and 1924 devastated the river settlement. During the first quarter of the 20th Century Mill Shoals. gradually moved east of the railroad tracks, away from the river. Thus Mill Shoals shifted from a 19th Century milling settlement on the shoals to a 20th Century way-station along the highway. Powerful but transitory economic resources have involved Mill Shoals in booms of productivity followed by periods of depression, depletion of strength and dispersion of employment.

The first boom occurred with the arrival of the Hawkins and Smith Stave Mill in 1892. By the turn of the century the population had mushroomed to 1,500, and the town included a flour mill, saw mill, lumber factory, tile factory, canning factory, grain elevator, two hotels, opera house, saloon, pool room, drug store, hardware store, restaurant, two groceries, barber shop, two general stores, two doctors and a livery stable. A bank was first established in 1903, and in 1906 a Farmers' Mutual Benefit Association was formed to raise and market livestock. Besides this, Mill Shoals had a weekly newspaper, sidewalks, and obtained electric lighting before Fairfield, with the departure of the stave mill in 1909 a ten-year lull followed which is remembered by old-timers primarily for its great reunions and travelling circus.

The Egyptian Tie and Timber Company sustained the economy for the decade of the 20's as the lumbering business boomed. The devastation of the depression was softened only by the oil boom from 1938 to the end of World War II. A long period of economic neglect has seen the growth of welfare dependency and the recent loss of the high school [Mills Prairie, on the Eastern outskirts of Mill Shoals] which had sustained the social life of Mill Shoals since it became a four-year school in 1945. As the nation becomes more dependent on local energy sources, Mill Shoals could well be near the center of a potential coal boom. The question for this community that has held on so tenaciously through boom times and hard times is how it can tie in to another boom and at the same time build a lasting foundation for continuous economic self-sufficiency in the future."

1978 Housing and Public Infrastructure 
"Public facilities include a post office, the elemen­tary school, a combination town hall and fire station. and a new town recreation park under construction. The 176 housing units in Mill Shoals are mainly small, single family dwellings, nearly one fourth of which are mobile homes. Fifty-five per cent of the housing was judged sound in a 1976 survey. At that time, about five per cent of the units were vacant, several of which could be restored for community projects.

The city water is piped into a majority of the homes, while others have pressurized cisterns.

Sewage is processed in septic tanks, many of which are sub-standard. Drainage for the considerable overflow is through open ditches, prohibiting normal laundry activity within the community and occasioning a serious health hazard.

Gas heating and electricity are found in most homes, but telephones are more scarce.

Four of the five churches serving the area are located in Mill Shoals."

Demographics

As of the census of 2000, there were 235 people, 111 households, and 72 families residing in the village. The racial makeup of the village was 99.57% White, and 0.43% from two or more races.

There were 111 households, out of which 24.3% had children under the age of 18 living with them, 57.7% were married couples living together, 5.4% had a female householder with no husband present, and 35.1% were non-families. 33.3% of all households were made up of individuals, and 16.2% had someone living alone who was 65 years of age or older. The average household size was 2.12 and the average family size was 2.67.

In the village, the population was spread out, with 20.0% under the age of 18, 8.1% from 18 to 24, 18.7% from 25 to 44, 33.6% from 45 to 64, and 19.6% who were 65 years of age or older. The median age was 48 years. For every 100 females, there were 92.6 males. For every 100 females age 18 and over, there were 93.8 males.

The median income for a household in the village was $27,292, and the median income for a family was $33,750. Males had a median income of $34,375 versus $20,000 for females. The per capita income for the village was $14,355. About 5.7% of families and 9.9% of the population were below the poverty line, including 17.6% of those under the age of eighteen and 11.4% of those 65 or over.

References

The Institute of Cultural Affairs 1978 Study 
In 1978, the Village of Mill Shoals Illinois was selected as a study site for the Institute of Cultural Affairs. At the time, the Village provided a starting point for other rural communities in America for a viable study comparable to communities in the developing world encompassing a frontier and pioneering spirit. "After visiting several of these towns and consulting with local citizens, the staff of the Institute was invited to initiate a Human Development Project in Mill Shoals, a representative of many small towns which experience themselves trapped between years of neglect and a challenging arrival of new opportunities.""The Mill Shoals Human Development Consultation is the initial step in a comprehensive development project for a four-state area touching parts of Missouri, Illinois, Indiana, and Kentucky. Mill Shoals is located in Illinois, two-thirds of the way from St. Louis, Missouri, to Evansville, Indiana, at the juncture of Interstate 64 and u. S. Highway 45. The Mill Shoals Project began through a cooperative effort of community leadership and the Institute of Cultural Affairs and deals with both social and economic problems. The intention is to recover a viable economic base and to involve the creative potential of Mill Shoals residents in establishing structures and services which ensure inclusive care and encourage fuller citizen involvement in all aspects  of community life. This project is a demonstration of methods which are adaptable to any similar community."

"As the decade of the 1980's approaches, the United States finds itself closing a period of introspection and opening a unique renaissance. Several unresolved tensions plagued the 6O's, but the celebration of the Bicentennial in the 70's offered many communities an opportunity to approach their history and its attendant conflicts with a new freshness. Recent dominant issues include the self-determination and even the survival of the small farmer in the midst of increasing agricultural centralization, the tension between environmental protection and extraction of energy resources, and the fiscal management of the nation in the midst of unabated inflation and employment discrepancies. Besides these are the increasing anxiety over growing crises in school support, the engagement of elders with increased life-expectancy, foreign trade competition, and the relationship of local community decision-making to national policy creation. Significant recovery of vitality in rural life along with cooperation between people in small towns across the nation can have a significant effect upon the urban as well as rural struggle to recover authentic community spirit. As proliferation of community groups unfolds, we are engaged in a period of intensive reclamation of participatory democracy. It is a time of testing American ingenuity by using it to enhance the quality of life in the emerging global society."

Background

"The Institute of Cultural Affairs began working in the Chicago inner-city in 1963 with people concerned for the revitalization of depressed neighborhoods. Since then, training programs stressing the human element in community renewal have been held across the country resulting in the opening of Institute offices in St. Louis, Indianapolis, and Peoria, as well as in 47 other locations in the United States. The current focus has been on holding town meetings, community forums designed to give local people a way to rehearse their heritage and to think through their future as a community. In May, 1978, several towns in southern Illinois that had held town meetings were included in a search to select a site in which to demonstrate the effectiveness of a comprehensive approach to rural community development. After visiting several of these towns and consulting with local citizens, the staff of the Institute was invited to initiate a Human Development Project in Mill Shoals, a representative of many small towns which experience themselves trapped between years of neglect and a challenging arrival of new opportunities. Members of the ICA staff established residency in Mill Shoals in late May and began preparations for the consult."

Study Period: June 1978

"The consult took place in Mill Shoals June 18–24, 1978. There were 105 consultants, sixty-six of whom live in the local project area. All of the 314 residents of Mill Shoals were directly or indirectly involved in the consult. Each day consult teams spent several hours talking with local residents in their homes and around the community. The forty-nine outside consultants came from twelve different states across the nation. These consultants represented both the public and private sectors and attended the consult at their own expense. Representatives from Inyan Wakagapi (North Dakota) and Fifth City (Chicago) Human Development Projects also participated. A special consultant was present from the nation of Ethiopia. An additional forty consultants from the vicinity came by for a day, contributing a wide range of expertise. Specific professions included education, veterinary medicine, building construction, labor economics, business management, legal services, community development, student activities, community health services, social art, public administration, bio-chemistry, and agriculture. The people of Mill Shoals also reflected a broad spectrum of expertise. These included electricians, masons, clergy, teachers, maintenance engineers, carpenters, housewives, heavy machinery mechanics, roofers, auto mechanics, farmers, florists, a nurse, and community leaders."

Process Design

"This diversified group of consultants acted as a unified research body using methods of comprehensive community renewal. First, the consult charted the operating vision of the people of Mill Shoals. Second, they discerned the underlying contradictions which are blocking the realization of that vision. Third, they built a set of overall practical proposals for dealing effectively with the contradictions. Fourth, they created a set of tactical systems by which the proposals could be realized. Finally, they discerned the actuating programs which would allow the application of the tactical systems. The time of the consultants was divided between work as teams in the field interviewing residents, inves­tigating resources, studying alternative possibilities, and parti­cipation in workshop sessions and plenary gatherings in which the accumulated data and team reports were formed into the corporate product of the consult. The aim of the consult was to assist residents of Mill Shoals in accelerating the expansion and promoting the impact of the project in the community."

Community Participation

"The readiness of Mill Shoals for the consult was striking. The Human Development Project had the support of the community from the outset, when a letter of invitation to the ICA received sixty­one signatures, including that of each of the town board members. The community accomplished two activities in preparation for the consult: replacement of sidewalks along U. S. Highway 45 and the initiation of a community park. Over 200 people attended the opening feast of the consult, and throughout the week residents increasingly participated in the work of the consult teams. The highlight of the week came on Saturday through two events: the workday and the closing feast. The morning was spent on visual displays and cleanups, focusing on the beautification of grounds along U. S. 45, through the center of town. Residents came from all over the community with their lawnmowers, tractors, and hand tools to transform the face of the town's main thorough­fare. Later, they gathered in the school gymnasium for the closing potluck feast to celebrate the week and to share the first products of their newly initiated light industries. One consultant remarked, "This consult introduced us to some wonderful people and a beautiful town. Many elements have come together this week--we worked with each other and formed a body of people and dreams full of power." The postmaster said, "We didn't know what to expect --so many people came into our town. But many of us came and worked, and what-we learned was how to love one another."

About the Institute of Cultural Affairs 
"The Institute of Cultural Affairs is a global research, training and demonstration group concerned with the human factor in world development. It is a program division of the Ecumenical Institute and was formally incorporated as a separate yet coordinate group in 1973. The Institute of Cultural Affairs is a not-for-profit tax-exempt corporation chartered in the state of Illinois and registered in the District of Columbia. The Institute of Cultural Affairs, convinced that effective human development begins at the local level, is engaged in planning and implementing these community development projects in various parts of the world. The Institute has headquarters in Bombay, Brussels, Canberra, Chicago, Hong Kong, and Nairobi. In addition, there are Institute offices in more than one hundred major cities serving twenty-three nations. The Institute's programs around the world are supported by grants, gifts, and contributions from government departments and agencies on the national, regional, and municipal levels, and from private foundations, corporations, trusts, and concerned individuals." 

Villages in Illinois
Villages in Wayne County, Illinois
Villages in White County, Illinois